Mostafa Adl (مصطفی عدل in Persian, also known as Manṣur-al-Salṭana, 1882 – 12 July 1950) was an Iranian politician, diplomat, juristic, former Ambassador of Iran to Switzerland (1935 — 1939) and president of University of Tehran (1941 —- 1942). He led the Iranian delegation to the United Nations Conference on International Organization also known as the San Francisco Conference.

During his time as the Minister of Culture of Iran, Adl was also the president of Tehran University, since the university was controlled by the ministry of culture at the time.

See also
 Adl (family)

References

Government ministers of Iran
Politicians from Tabriz
1950 deaths
Ambassadors of Iran to Switzerland
1882 births
Ministers of Justice of Iran
University of Paris alumni
20th-century Iranian lawyers
Iranian expatriates in France
20th-century Iranian politicians
Adl family
Academic staff of the University of Tehran